"Girls Like" is a song written and performed by British rapper Tinie Tempah featuring vocals from Swedish singer Zara Larsson. The song was released as a digital download in the United Kingdom on 26 February 2016 as the second single from Tempah's third studio album, Youth.

The song entered the UK Singles Chart at number 15, and it later peaked at number five, becoming Tempah's thirteenth top five single, and Zara Larsson's third.

Music video
Tempah previewed a clip onto his Instagram account, showing him and two girls. The full music video premiered on his YouTube account on 17 March 2016. The music video was shot in Woodstock, a suburb of Cape Town. As of October 2022, the music video has over 223 million views on YouTube.

Track listing

Live performances
Tempah and Larsson performed the song live for the first time on The Jonathan Ross Show on 2 April 2016. Tempah also performed the song live at Wembley Stadium on 21 May 2016, ahead of the FA Cup final.

Charts and certifications

Weekly charts

Year-end charts

Certifications

Release history

References

2016 singles
2016 songs
Deep house songs
Tinie Tempah songs
Zara Larsson songs
Parlophone singles
Songs written by Tinie Tempah
Songs written by Zara Larsson